Songo Mnara Island is an island located in Pande Mikoma ward in Kilwa District in Lindi Region of Tanzania's Indian Ocean coast. The island is home to the UNESCO World Heritage Site of Songo Mnara, one of seven world heritage sites in the country. The Island is the ancestral home of the Machinga people.

References

 Islands of Lindi Region
 Islands of Tanzania